Kimani Griffin  (born 2 July 1990) is an American speed skater who competes internationally.
 
He participated at the 2018 Winter Olympics.

References

External links

1990 births
Living people
American male speed skaters 
Olympic speed skaters of the United States 
Speed skaters at the 2018 Winter Olympics